The Pianist (El Pianista) was a 1998 Catalan-language film directed by Mario Gas, and based on a novel by Manuel Vázquez Montalbán.  It tells the story of two musicians, played in their old age by Serge Reggiani and Laurent Terzieff and in their youth by Pere Ponce and Jordi Mollà, who were friends at the onset of the Spanish Civil War.  They meet 60 years later, and the movie shows the strikingly different paths which they took in the circumstances of the war.

Cast
 Pascale Roberts as Sra. Amparo
 Michel Robin as Floreal

External links
 

1998 films
Catalan-language films
Films based on Spanish novels
1990s Spanish-language films
Films about classical music and musicians
Films about pianos and pianists
1998 drama films